Sidi Abdel Rahman is a village on the coast of the Mediterranean Sea in Egypt.

Overview
Sidi Abdel Rahman is located in the Egyptian Western Desert on a bay of the Mediterranean Sea, has a beautiful beach, and is a great place to rest.

There are a large number of unexploded landmines, dating from World War II in the area that have caused human casualties and hindered development in the area over the years.

Sidi Abdel Rahman is not far from the site of the famous 1942 Battle of El Alamein of World War II. Mausoleums and a cemetery for the Allies can be found nearby, with at least ninety-nine soldiers laid to rest there. The unmarked remains of thousands of German soldiers can also befound in the cemetery. On September 30, 1942, Luftwaffe ace Hans-Joachim Marseille, who claimed an unrivaled total of 158 aircraft destroyed against the Allies, was killed near the settlement. The site is marked with a pyramid about 10km south of the village.

Sidi Abdel Rahman was just a "modest local resort". The Gulf of Sidi Abdel Rahman on the Mediterranean including the Al Alamein Hotel were auctioned off by the Egyptian General Company for Tourism and Hotels (EGOTH) in 2006, and Emaar Egypt, a subsidiary of Emaar Dubai won the rights to develop the area. The revenue received from the sale was to be used for upgrading historical Egyptian hotels, according to the Minister of Investment Mahmoud Mohieldin involved in the deal.

The developer, with deep pockets, who purchased Sidi Abdel Rahman proposed to develop a year-round city at a hefty cost of 1.74 billion. DJ Bob Sinclair performed in August, 2008 at Marassi. Emaar Egypt's initial public offering in Egypt in 2015 was the largest IPO in Egypt, since 2007.

References

External links
 Al Alamein Hotel Home Page
 Marassi Resort Home Page

Populated places in Matrouh Governorate
Populated coastal places in Egypt
Geography of Egypt
Tourist attractions in Egypt